3 St Peter's Square is a high-rise hotel and aparthotel in Manchester city centre, England. Designed by Stephenson Studio with Leach Rhodes Walker as the delivery architect, the building comprises a 256 unit aparthotel operated by Staycity and a hotel containing 328 rooms operated by Motel One. As of February 2023, it is the largest purpose-built hotel in Manchester.

Peterloo House
The site of 3 St Peter's Square was previously occupied by Peterloo House, an eight-storey 1970s office block that was demolished in 2018.

3 St Peter's Square
The developer, Property Alliance Group, had originally earmarked the site for new office space, but appraisals identified the potential for a hotel to be constructed instead.

Construction work for 3 St Peter's Square started in 2017, and was completed in 2022.

The building is finished in a decorative pre-cast concrete façade, similar in tone to the neighbouring One St Peter's Square and Two St Peter's Square office buildings and designed to be sympathetic to its location, close to the landmarks of Manchester Town Hall and Central Library.

Motel One occupies the first eight floors with 328 hotel rooms. Staycity Aparthotels occupies floors nine to 20, providing 256 studios and one- bedroom units under its 'Wilde Aparthotels' brand.

References

Buildings and structures in Manchester
Hotels in Manchester
Hotel buildings completed in 2022
Hotels established in 2022
2022 establishments in England